Raymundo Antonio Torres Ruiz (12 April 1958 – 27 October 2012) was a Mexican baseball outfielder who spent 22 seasons in professional baseball, including 20 in the Mexican League.

Personal life
Torres was born in Hermosillo, Sonora, Mexico and died in Mérida, Yucatán at the age of 54 in a car accident.

Playing career
He began his career in 1977, playing for the Alacranes de Durango. He remained with them through 1978. From 1979 to 1982, he played in the Chicago White Sox organization, before returning to the Mexican League partway through the 1982 season, where he remained until his retirement in 1998. He spent most of his Mexican League career with the Leones de Yucatán.

He was elected to the Mexican Professional Baseball Hall of Fame in 2006.

Sources

External links

1958 births
2012 deaths
Alacranes de Campeche players
Alacranes de Durango players
Appleton Foxes players
Baseball players from Sonora
Diablos Rojos del México players
Edmonton Trappers players
Glens Falls White Sox players
Industriales de Monterrey players
Iowa Oaks players
Jalisco BBC players
Knoxville Sox players
Leones de Yucatán players
Mexican Baseball Hall of Fame inductees
Mexican expatriate baseball players in Canada
Mexican expatriate baseball players in the United States
Mexican League baseball pitchers
Naranjeros de Hermosillo players
People from La Colorada Municipality